The twenty-second World Masters Athletics Championships were held in Perth Australia, from October 26–November 6, 2016.  This was the first even year of the biennial championship as beginning in 2016, the championships moved to be held in even numbered years.  The World Masters Athletics Championships serve the division of the sport of athletics for people over 35 years of age, referred to as Masters athletics.

A full range of track and field events were held, along with a cross country race and a marathon.

Results
100 metres

M35 100 metres
Wind: +2.5

M40 100 metres
Wind: +3.4

M45 100 metres
Wind: +3.2

M50 100 metres
Wind: +4.8

M55 100 metres
Wind: +2.3

M60 100 metres
Wind: +1.6

M65 100 metres
Wind: +2.8

M70 100 metres
Wind: +4.0

M75 100 metres
Wind: +3.1

M80 100 metres
Wind: +4.7

M85 100 metres
Wind: +1.2

M90 100 metres
Wind: +2.1

M95 100 metres
Wind: +2.1

200 metres

M35 200 metres
Wind: +2.5

M40 200 metres
Wind: +1.7

M45 200 metres
Wind: +4.1

M50 200 metres
Wind: +3.2

M55 200 metres
Wind: +1.4

M60 200 metres
Wind: +2.3

M65 200 metres
Wind: +3.3

M70 200 metres
Wind: +1.8

M75 200 metres
Wind: +3.0

M80 200 metres
Wind: +3.0

M85 200 metres
Wind: +2.4

M90 200 metres
Wind: +3.1

M95 200 metres
Wind: +3.1

400 metres

M35 400 metres

M40 400 metres

M45 400 metres

M50 400 metres

M55 400 metres

M60 400 metres

M65 400 metres

M70 400 metres

M75 400 metres

M80 400 metres

M85 400 metres

M90 400 metres

M95 400 metres

800 metres

M35 800 metres

M40 800 metres

M45 800 metres

M50 800 metres

M55 800 metres

M60 800 metres

M65 800 metres

M70 800 metres

M75 800 metres

M80 800 metres

M85 800 metres

M90 800 metres

M95 800 metres

1500 metres

M35 1500 metres

M40 1500 metres

M45 1500 metres

M50 1500 metres

M55 1500 metres

M60 1500 metres

M65 1500 metres

M70 1500 metres

M75 1500 metres

M80 1500 metres

M85 1500 metres

M90 1500 metres

M95 1500 metres

5000 metres

M35 5000 metres

M40 5000 metres

M45 5000 metres

M50 5000 metres

M55 5000 metres

M60 5000 metres

M65 5000 metres

M70 5000 metres

M75 5000 metres

M80 5000 metres

M85 5000 metres

M90 5000 metres

Cross country

M35 8000 metres Cross Country

M40 8000 metres Cross Country

M45 8000 metres Cross Country

M50 8000 metres Cross Country

M55 8000 metres Cross Country

M60 8000 metres Cross Country

M65 8000 metres Cross Country

M70 8000 metres Cross Country

M75 8000 metres Cross Country

M80 8000 metres Cross Country

M85 8000 metres Cross Country

M90 8000 metres Cross Country

10,000 metres

M35 10000 metres

M40 10000 metres

M45 10000 metres

M50 10000 metres

M55 10000 metres

M60 10000 metres

M65 10000 metres

M70 10000 metres

M75 10000 metres

M80 10000 metres

M85 10000 metres

M90 10000 metres

Half marathon

M35 Half marathon

M40 Half marathon

M45 Half marathon

M50 Half marathon

M55 Half marathon

M60 Half marathon

M65 Half marathon

M70 Half marathon

M75 Half marathon

M80 Half marathon

M85 Half marathon

Marathon

M35 Marathon

M40 Marathon

M45 Marathon

M50 Marathon

M55 Marathon

M60 Marathon

M65 Marathon

M70 Marathon

M75 Marathon

M85 Marathon

Short hurdles

M70 80 metres hurdles
Wind: +0.9

M75 80 metres hurdles
Wind: -0.3

M80 80 metres hurdles
Wind: -0.1

M85 80 metres hurdles
Wind: -0.4

M50 100 metres hurdles
Wind: +0.5

M55 100 metres hurdles
Wind: -0.3

M60 100 metres hurdles
Wind: -0.7

M65 100 metres hurdles
Wind: +0.9

M35 110 metres hurdles
Wind: +0.1

M40 110 metres hurdles
Wind: +0.1

M45 110 metres hurdles
Wind: +0.9

Long hurdles

M80 200 metres hurdles
Wind: +2.3

M60 300 metres hurdles

M65 300 metres hurdles

M70 300 metres hurdles

M75 300 metres hurdles

M35 400 metres hurdles

M40 400 metres hurdles

M45 400 metres hurdles

M50 400 metres hurdles

M55 400 metres hurdles

Steeplechase

M60 2000 metres steeplechase

M65 2000 metres steeplechase

M70 2000 metres steeplechase

M75 2000 metres steeplechase

M80 2000 metres steeplechase

M85 2000 metres steeplechase

M35 3000 metres steeplechase

M40 3000 metres steeplechase

M45 3000 metres steeplechase

M50 3000 metres steeplechase

M55 3000 metres steeplechase

4x100 metres relay

M35 4x100 metres relay

M40 4x100 metres relay

M45 4x100 metres relay

M50 4x100 metres relay

M55 4x100 metres relay

M60 4x100 metres relay

M65 4x100 metres relay

M70 4x100 metres relay

M75 4x100 metres relay

M80 4x100 metres relay

M85 4x100 metres relay

4x400 metres relay

M35 4x400 metres relay

M40 4x400 metres relay

M45 4x400 metres relay

M50 4x400 metres relay

M55 4x400 metres relay

M60 4x400 metres relay

M65 4x400 metres relay

M70 4x400 metres relay

M75 4x400 metres relay

M85 4x400 metres relay

High Jump

M35 High Jump

M40 High Jump

M45 High Jump

M50 High Jump

M55 High Jump

M60 High Jump

M65 High Jump

M70 High Jump

M75 High Jump

M80 High Jump

M85 High Jump

Pole Vault

M35 Pole Vault

M40 Pole Vault

M45 Pole Vault

M50 Pole Vault

M55 Pole Vault

M60 Pole Vault

M65 Pole Vault

M70 Pole Vault

M75 Pole Vault

M80 Pole Vault

M85 Pole Vault

Long Jump

M35 Long Jump

M40 Long Jump

M45 Long Jump

M50 Long Jump

M55 Long Jump

M60 Long Jump

M65 Long Jump

M70 Long Jump

M75 Long Jump

M80 Long Jump

M85 Long Jump

M90 Long Jump

Triple Jump

M35 Triple Jump

M40 Triple Jump

M45 Triple Jump

M50 Triple Jump

M55 Triple Jump

M60 Triple Jump

M65 Triple Jump

M70 Triple Jump

M75 Triple Jump

M80 Triple Jump

M85 Triple Jump

Shot Put

M35 Shot Put

M40 Shot Put

M45 Shot Put

M50 Shot Put

M55 Shot Put

M60 Shot Put

M65 Shot Put

M70 Shot Put

M75 Shot Put

M80 Shot Put

M85 Shot Put

M90 Shot Put

Discus Throw

M35 Discus Throw

M40 Discus Throw

M45 Discus Throw

M50 Discus Throw

M55 Discus Throw

M60 Discus Throw

M65 Discus Throw

M70 Discus Throw

M75 Discus Throw

M80 Discus Throw

M85 Discus Throw

M90 Discus Throw

Hammer Throw

M35 Hammer Throw

M40 Hammer Throw

M45 Hammer Throw

M50 Hammer Throw

M55 Hammer Throw

M60 Hammer Throw

M65 Hammer Throw

M70 Hammer Throw

M75 Hammer Throw

M80 Hammer Throw

M85 Hammer Throw

M90 Hammer Throw

Javelin Throw

M35 Javelin Throw

M40 Javelin Throw

M45 Javelin Throw

M50 Javelin Throw

M55 Javelin Throw

M60 Javelin Throw

M65 Javelin Throw

M70 Javelin Throw

M75 Javelin Throw

M80 Javelin Throw

M85 Javelin Throw

M90 Javelin Throw

Weight Throw

M35 Weight Throw

M40 Weight Throw

M45 Weight Throw

M50 Weight Throw

M55 Weight Throw

M60 Weight Throw

M65 Weight Throw

M70 Weight Throw

M75 Weight Throw

M80 Weight Throw

M85 Weight Throw

M90 Weight Throw

Decathlon

M35 Decathlon

M40 Decathlon

M45 Decathlon

M50 Decathlon

M55 Decathlon

M60 Decathlon

M65 Decathlon

M70 Decathlon

M75 Decathlon

M80 Decathlon

M85 Decathlon

Throws Pentathlon

M35 Throws Pentathlon

M40 Throws Pentathlon

M45 Throws Pentathlon

M50 Throws Pentathlon

M55 Throws Pentathlon

M60 Throws Pentathlon

M65 Throws Pentathlon

M70 Throws Pentathlon

M75 Throws Pentathlon

M80 Throws Pentathlon

M85 Throws Pentathlon

M90 Throws Pentathlon

5000 metres Racewalk

M35 5000 metres Racewalk

M40 5000 metres Racewalk

M45 5000 metres Racewalk

M50 5000 metres Racewalk

M55 5000 metres Racewalk

M60 5000 metres Racewalk

M65 5000 metres Racewalk

M70 5000 metres Racewalk

M75 5000 metres Racewalk

M80 5000 metres Racewalk

M85 5000 metres Racewalk

M90 5000 metres Racewalk

10,000 metres race walk

M35 10,000 metres race walk

M40 10,000 metres race walk

M45 10,000 metres race walk

M50 10,000 metres race walk

M55 10,000 metres race walk

M60 10,000 metres race walk

M65 10,000 metres race walk

M70 10,000 metres race walk

M75 10,000 metres race walk

M80 10,000 metres race walk

M85 10,000 metres race walk

M90 10,000 metres race walk

20,000 metres race walk

M35 20,000 metres race walk

M40 20,000 metres race walk

M45 20,000 metres race walk

M50 20,000 metres race walk

M55 20,000 metres race walk

M60 20,000 metres race walk

M65 20,000 metres race walk

M70 20,000 metres race walk

M75 20,000 metres race walk

M80 20,000 metres race walk

M85 20,000 metres race walk

M90 20,000 metres race walk

See also
 2016 World Masters Athletics Championships Women

References

Complete results

World Masters Athletics Championships
World Masters Athletics Championships
International athletics competitions hosted by Australia
World Masters Athletics Championships